Yukon is the westernmost of Canada's three northern territories. Its capital is Whitehorse. People from Yukon are known as Yukoners. Unlike in other Canadian provinces and territories, Statistics Canada uses the entire territory as a single at-large census division.

Population of Yukon: 40,232 (2021 Canadian Census)

 Percentage of Canadian population : 0.10%
 Population growth rate for 2007: +5.8%

Population history

Source: Statistics Canada

Population geography

Major communities

Visible minorities and Indigenous Peoples

Languages
The 2006 Canadian census showed a population of 30,372.Of the 29,940 singular responses to the census question concerning 'mother tongue' the most commonly reported languages were:

There were also about 40 single-language responses for Ukrainian; 30 each for Czech and the Scandinavian languages; and about 25 single-language responses each for Italian and Japanese. In addition, there were also 130 responses of both English and a 'non-official language'; 10 of both French and a 'non-official language'; 110 of both English and French; and about 175 people who either did not respond to the question, or reported multiple non-official languages, or else gave some other unenumerated response. Yukon's official languages are English and French. (Figures shown are for the number of single language responses and the percentage of total single-language responses.)

Religion

Migration

Immigration

The 2016 Canadian census counted a total of 4,410 immigrants living in Yukon.The most commonly reported countries of birth for these immigrants were:

Internal migration

A total of 7,400 people moved to Yukon from other parts of Canada between 1996 and 2006 while 10,505 people moved in the opposite direction. These movements resulted in a net influx of 230 from the Northwest Territories; and a net outmigration of 2,505 to Alberta, 915 to British Columbia and 115 to New Brunswick. There was a net influx of 120 francophones from Quebec during this period. All net inter-provincial and official minority movements of more than 100 persons are given.

See also
Demographics of Canada

References

Yukon
Yukon society